Parsa is a rural municipality in Sarlahi District, a part of Province No. 2 in Nepal. It is situated 10 km East from Malangwa which is headquarter of Sarlahi. It was formed in 2016 occupying current 6 sections (wards) from previous 6 former VDCs. It occupies an area of 23.12 km2 with a total population of 21,650. The major language spoken in the rural municipality are Maithili and Bajjika.

Schools
In Parsa municipality, there are five government schools. Among them two are secondary schools:1. Shree Public Secondary School is in the northern part of the village. This school is up to 12th grade. Students from nearby villages also attend this school.

2. Shree Nepal Rastriya Baiju Janata Secondary School is in ward no.2 in Sangrampur village. This is the first school in the rural municipality which started 11&12 classes.

Markets
There are two main market places. One in Sangrampur and other in Parsa village. In Sangrampur market sets on Monday and Friday while in Parsa it sets on Sunday and Thursday. There are many shops in both the markets which sets for vegetables and goods selling every week. These markets are near the Indian border so many Indian residents also come to trade goods in these markets. Some other small markets are in Jingadwa, Narayanpur, and Parsa villages.

Boundaries
East- Hardi Khola
South- Indian border
West- Sakhuvillage of Brahmpuri R. M. Waba
West North- Nokavillage of Brahmpuri R. M. Ilwa
North- Pivillage of Brahmpuri R. M.
West- of Haripurwa municipality. Dhagarwa

References

External links
UN map of the municipalities of Sarlahi  District

Populated places in Sarlahi District
Rural municipalities of Nepal established in 2017
Rural municipalities in Madhesh Province